The 1857 Pennsylvania gubernatorial election occurred on October 13, 1857. Incumbent governor James Pollock, a Whig, was not a candidate for re-election. Democratic candidate William F. Packer defeated Republican candidate David Wilmot and American Party candidate Isaac Hazlehurst to become Governor of Pennsylvania.

Results

References

1857
Pennsylvania
Gubernatorial
November 1857 events